Schenkia is a genus of flowering plants in the gentian family, Gentianaceae. It is sometimes included in the genus Centaurium.

Selected species
Schenkia australis (R.Br.) G.Mans. (Australia)
Schenkia sebaeoides Griseb. – Āwiwi (Hawaii)
Schenkia spicata (L.) G.Mans. (North Africa, Europe, Asia)

References

External links

 
Gentianaceae genera